Beggin' for More is a country album released by singer-songwriter Kyle Park in March 2013.

History

Most of the album's tracks were written or co-written by Park. It is the second solo album produced solely by him. He released it through his own label, Kyle Park Records, on March 19, 2013. The album went to #4 on country iTunes on March 21, and was stated to have a "fresh sound; traditional country mixed with restless, U2-style guitar sounds and unexpected chord changes."

Singles
The track "The Night is Young" was written by Park around a campfire.  After its release in early 2013, the single climbed to #3 on the Texas Country Charts, later reaching #1. He commissioned fans to create the music video for the track. The other single from the album, “True Love," also climbed various country charts.

Track listing

Personnel

Production
Kyle Park 	- Producer
John Michael Whitby 	- Executive Producer
Austin Deptula 	- Mixing
Dave Percefull 	- Engineer, String Engineer
Will Armstrong 	- Engineer
Sam Seifert 	- Engineer
Will Harrison 	- Engineer
Memo Guerro 	- Assistant Engineer
Eric Lenington 	- Design, Photography

Musicians
Will Armstrong   - drums, percussion
John Carroll   - electric guitar, baritone guitar, nylon string guitar
Milo Deering	- steel guitar
Tommy Detamore 	- steel guitar
Joe Manuel 	- acoustic guitar, electric guitar
Hayden Nicholas    - acoustic guitar, baritone guitar, slide guitar
Kyle Park   - acoustic guitar, electric guitar, baritone guitar, lead vocals
Wes Hightower 	- background vocals
Cindy Cashdollar 	- Dobro
Larry Franklin - 	fiddle
Glenn Fukunaga 	- Bass guitar
John Michael Whitby   - Hammond B-3 organ, piano, Wurlitzer
The Tusco String Quartet  -	Strings

Chart performance

References

External links
KylePark.com
Album at AllMusic

2013 albums
Kyle Park albums